Paul John Werbos (born 1947) is an American social scientist and machine learning pioneer. He is best known for his 1974 dissertation, which first described the process of training artificial neural networks through backpropagation of errors. He also was a pioneer of recurrent neural networks.

Werbos was one of the original three two-year Presidents of the International Neural Network Society (INNS). In 1995, he was awarded the IEEE Neural Network Pioneer Award for the discovery of backpropagation and other basic neural network learning frameworks such as Adaptive Dynamic Programming.

Werbos has also written on quantum mechanics and other areas of physics.  He also has interest in larger questions relating to consciousness, the foundations of physics, and human potential.

He served as program director in the National Science Foundation for several years until 2015.

References

External links
Home Page

1947 births
Living people
Artificial intelligence researchers
Harvard University alumni
American computer scientists